Glen Abramowski is an American para-alpine skier. Diagnosed with a degenerative eye condition retinitis pigmentosa, he has been legally blind since birth.

He represented the United States at the 1984 Winter Paralympics in alpine skiing; he won the silver medal at the Men's Giant Slalom B2 event. 

He won both a Silver and Bronze medal at the 1982 World Disabled Ski Championships in Switzerland, and won three Gold and one Silver medal at the 1990 World Disabled Ski Championships held at Winter Park in Colorado.

Graduating from the University of Colorado with a degree in aerospace engineering, Abramowski went on to become Chairman of the Board of Directors for The Delta Gamma Center for Children with Visual Impairments in St. Louis, Missouri, where he spearheaded charity events for blind youth.

In 2019 he featured on an episode of podcast The Geoholics.

He continues to ski recreationally alongside his two children.

References 

Living people
Year of birth missing (living people)
Place of birth missing (living people)
Paralympic alpine skiers of the United States
American male alpine skiers
Alpine skiers at the 1984 Winter Paralympics
Medalists at the 1984 Winter Paralympics
Paralympic silver medalists for the United States
Paralympic medalists in alpine skiing
American blind people
20th-century American people